Korssjøen is a lake in the municipality of Røros in Trøndelag county, Norway.

See also
List of lakes in Norway

References

	

Røros
Lakes of Trøndelag